Torredonjimeno is a city and municipality of Spain located in the province of Jaén, in the autonomous community of Andalusia. According to the 2020 census (INE), the city had a population of 13,632 inhabitants, with 6,954 males and 7,172 females. It covers an area of 157 km2 and is at an elevation of 586 m.

References

External links
Torredonjimeno - Sistema de Información Multiterritorial de Andalucía

Municipalities in the Province of Jaén (Spain)